The 1903 Oklahoma A&M Aggies football team represented Oklahoma A&M College in the 1903 college football season. This was the third year of football at A&M and the team did not have a head coach. The Aggies played their home games in Stillwater, Oklahoma Territory. They finished the season 0–0–2.

Schedule

References

Oklahoma AandM
Oklahoma State Cowboys football seasons
College football undefeated seasons
College football winless seasons
Oklahoma AandM Aggies football